Honoré IV (Honoré Charles Anne Grimaldi; 17 May 1758 – 16 February 1819) was Prince of Monaco and Duke of Valentinois from 1814 to 16 February 1819. Because of his health, the state of affairs was managed by a regency of his brother Joseph Grimaldi, and his son Prince Honoré V.

Life
He was the son of Prince Honoré III and Maria Caterina Brignole. 

During the French occupation of Monaco, Honoré IV was imprisoned for several years.  After the fall of Napoleon I in 1814, he regained control of the principalitythanks to a clause added by Charles Maurice de Talleyrand-Périgord at the Congress of Vienna stating, "the Prince of Monaco should return to his estates"and passed on his titles to his eldest son, Prince Honoré V.

Illnesses resulting from his imprisonment incapacitated Honoré IV in his later years, and following the re-establishment of the Principality in 1814, a regency was established to rule in Honoré's name.  This regency was directed, first, by his brother Joseph Grimaldi, then from 1815 by his son, the Hereditary Prince Honoré, who succeeded him in 1819 as Sovereign Prince Honoré V.

Family
Honoré IV married Louise Félicité Victoire d'Aumont, Duchess of Aumont, Duchess Mazarin and of La Meilleraye on 15 July 1777 in Paris. They divorced in 1798. They had two sons:

 Honoré V, Prince of Monaco (1778–1841)
 Florestan, Prince of Monaco (1785–1856)

Ancestry

References

External links
 Official Website of the Princely Family of Monaco

|-

|-

|-

1758 births
1819 deaths
18th-century peers of France
19th-century Princes of Monaco
House of Grimaldi
Princes of Monaco
Burials at the Cathedral of Our Lady Immaculate
Monegasque princes
Hereditary Princes of Monaco
Monegasque people of Italian descent
People of Ligurian descent
Marquesses of Baux
Dukes of Valentinois
Members of the Chamber of Peers of the Bourbon Restoration

Dukes of Mayenne